Carl August Limberg (July 6, 1883 – May 13, 1916) was an American racecar driver who was killed during a AAA-sanctioned national championship race.

Biography
Limberg was born in Mount Auburn, Iowa on July 6, 1886, to German grandparents.  He grew up in San Jose, California, where he became a bicycle racer, participating in endurance competitions across the United States.  In 1908, Limberg moved to Brooklyn, New York and started auto racing in 1910.  He was employed by Delage.

Death
On May 13, 1916, Limberg competed in the Metropolitan Trophy, a 150-mile AAA-sanctioned national championship race held at Sheepshead Bay Speedway before 25,000 spectators. Driving car No. 6, he was in the lead on lap 15 when the right rear tire came off his Delage. Both men died of their injuries.

References

External links

1883 births
1916 deaths
People from Benton County, Iowa
Racing drivers from Iowa
Racing drivers from San Jose, California
AAA Championship Car drivers
Racing drivers who died while racing
Sports deaths in New York (state)